The Indalo is a prehistoric magical symbol found in the cave of "Los Letreros" ("The Signboards") in Sierra de María-Los Vélez Natural Park in Vélez Blanco, Almería, Andalusia, Spain. It has been customary to paint the Indalo symbol on the front of houses and businesses to protect them from evil (similar to Kokopelli of the south-western US) and is considered to be a god totem. The indalo has an origin in the Levante, Spain and dates back to 2500 BC. The pictograph was named in memory of Saint Indaletius, and means Indal eccius (Messenger of the Gods) in the Iberian language.

Legend has it that the Indalo was a ghost that could hold and carry a rainbow in his hands (thus the arch over the head of the man). The Indalo has been adopted as the official symbol in the province of Almería, Spain. The Indalo symbol is used as a lucky charm in the Almería region also. To carry the charm is only beneficial if it has been presented as a gift. 
Some people also believe that the story behind the symbol of the Indalo man is about a man who escapes in a cave to get away from the rain, then when the rain stops, out comes a rainbow and when the man walks away from the wall of the cave, the image is left there.

The American indigenous rights organization Cultural Survival uses an Indalo symbol on its logo.

References

European gods
Spanish culture
Basque and Iberian deities
Magic symbols